Anne Covell (9 August 1950 – 3 November 2020) was a Canadian sprinter. She competed in the women's 400 metres at the 1968 Summer Olympics.

References

1950 births
2020 deaths
Athletes (track and field) at the 1968 Summer Olympics
Canadian female sprinters
Olympic track and field athletes of Canada
Sportspeople from British Columbia
People from Delta, British Columbia
Olympic female sprinters